Alto guitar may refer to:

 Eleven-string alto guitar, also called the altgitarr, the Swedish name given to it by its Swedish inventor
 Six-string alto guitar, a classical guitar with light strings and a small body, designed to be tuned higher than the normal classical guitar
 Tenor guitar, when tuned to G-C-E-A one fourth higher than the top four strings of the modern classical guitar

See also 
 Guitar (disambiguation)